The following is a list of notable people from Quebec City, Quebec, Canada. See Category: People from Quebec City for a more systematic list.

A
André Arthur (1943-2022), radio host and politician

B
 Alfred Bailey (1905-1997), farmer, educator, poet, anthropologist
 Steve Barakatt (b. 1973), musician
 Marty Barry (1905-1969), former NHL player
 Myriam Bédard (b. 1969), biathlon, three Olympic medals
 Johanne Bégin (b. 1971), water polo, 2000 Summer Olympics
 Patrice Bergeron (b. 1985), NHL player for the Boston Bruins
 Steve Bernier (b. 1985), NHL player
 Sylvie Bernier (b. 1964), diving, gold medal, 1984 Summer Olympics
 Martin Biron (b. 1977), NHL goaltender
 Mathieu Biron (b. 1980), NHL player
 Céline Bonnier (b. 1965), actor
 Gaétan Boucher (b. 1958), speed skating, four Olympic medals
 Francis Bouillon (b. 1975), NHL player for the Nashville Predators

C
 Dayana Cadeau (b. 1966), Haitian-born Canadian American professional bodybuilder
 Lawrence Cannon (b. 1947), federal politician, Canadian minister of foreign affairs
 Marc Chouinard (b. 1977), NHL player
 Jean-Philippe Côté (b. 1982), NHL player

D
 Kevin Dineen (b. 1963), former NHL player
 Stéphane Dion (b. 1955), politician
 Campbell Mellis Douglas (1840-1909), winner of the Victoria Cross
 Jessica Dubé (b. 1987), figure skater
 Paul Dumont (1920-2008), administrator of the Quebec Major Junior Hockey League
 Gaétan Duchesne (1962-2007), NHL player

F
 Adine Fafard-Drolet (1876-1963), singer and founder of a music school
 Jonathan Ferland (b. 1983), AHL player
 Jeff Fillion, radio personality
 Lionel Fleury (1912-1997), president of the Canadian Amateur Hockey Association and the Quebec Amateur Hockey Association
 Glenn Ford (1916-2006), actor

G
 Louis-Philippe Gagné (1900-1964), newspaper editor and politician in the United States
 Simon Gagné (b. 1980), NHL player for the Tampa Bay Lightning
 André-Philippe Gagnon (b. 1962), comedian
 Marc Garneau (b. 1949), astronaut and politician
 Richard Garneau (1930-2013), sports journalist
 Félix-Odilon Gauthier (1808–1876), lawyer and judge
 Émile Genest (1921-2003), actor
 Marie Gignac, actor
 Neil Gillman (1933-2017), theologian
 Léon Gingras (1808-1860), Catholic priest, educator, seminary administrator and author
 Rémy Girard (b. 1950), actor
 Alexandre Giroux (b. 1981), NHL player
 Elena Grosheva (b. 1979), gymnast

H
 Anne Hébert (1916-2000), writer
 Paul Hébert (1924-2017), actor

K
 Larkin Kerwin (1924-2004), physicist, President of the Canadian Space Agency
 Cornelius Krieghoff (1815-1872), painter
Pom Klementieff (b. 1986), actress

L
 Régis Labeaume (b. 1956), mayor
 Audrey Lacroix (b. 1983), swimmer
 Claire Lamarche (b. 1945), television host
 Michel Lamarche (1947-2019), retired professional wrestler
 Stéphane Lapointe (b. 1971), film and television director
 Pierre Lavertu (b. 1990), football player
 Marie-Renée Lavoie (b. 1974), writer
 Okill Massey Learmonth (1894-1917), winner of the Victoria Cross
 Félix Leclerc (1914-1988), musician
 Alice Lemieux-Lévesque (1905-1983), writer
 Félix Lengyel (b. 1995), streamer/internet personality
 Robert Lepage (b. 1957), actor
 Jean Lesage (1912-1980), politician

M
Kurtis MacDermid (b. 1994), ice hockey player
Norm Macdonald (1959-2021), comedian
Simon Mailloux (b. 1983), Canadian Forces officer
Joe Malone (1890-1969), early NHL player
Michael Mando (b. 1981), actor
Pauline Marois (b. 1949), politician and leader of the Parti Québécois
Philippe Marquis (b. 1989), moguls skier
Rick Martel (b. 1956), retired professional wrestler
Pénélope McQuade (b. 1970), radio and television host
Mitsou (b. 1970), pop singer
François Morency (b. 1966), comedian
Terry Mosher (b. 1942), cartoonist for the Montreal Gazette

N
Safia Nolin (b. 1992), singer-songwriter

P
 Bruno Pelletier (b. 1962), musician
 François Pérusse (b. 1960), comedian
 Pierre Pettigrew (b. 1951), former politician, Canadian Minister of Foreign Affairs 2004-2006 
 Jacques Poulin (b. 1937), writer
 Marc-Antoine Pouliot (b. 1985), NHL player

R
 Manon Rhéaume (b. 1972), ice hockey goaltender 
 Jacques Richard (1952-2002), NHL player, deceased
 Alys Robi (1923-2011), musician 
 Ariane Roy (b. 1977), singer-songwriter
 Gabrielle Roy (1909-1983), writer
 Patrick Roy (b. 1965), retired NHL goaltender

S
 Colette Samson (1923-1991), social activist
 Paul Stastny (b. 1985), NHL player
 Yan Stastny (b. 1982), former NHL player

T
 Louis-Alexandre Taschereau (1867-1952), early Quebec politician
 Yves Thériault (1915-1983), writer
 Marie Tifo (b. 1949), actress
 Gabrielle Laïla Tittley (b. 1988), artist
 Roland Michel Tremblay (b. 1972), writer 
 Gilles Turcot (1917-2010), Commander of the Canadian Army during the October Crisis
 Mélanie Turgeon (b. 1976), skier
 Richard Ernest William Turner (1871-1961), winner of the Victoria Cross

V
Richard Verreau (1926-2005), musician
 Gilles Vigneault (b. 1928), musician

W
 Mike Ward (b. 1973), comedian
 David Watson (1869-1922), army general
 Christian Wolanin (b. 1995), NHL player for Ottawa Senators

Religious people
 Blessed Marie de l'Incarnation, née Marie Guyart (1599-1672)
 Blessed François de Laval (1623-1708), first bishop of New France and founder of Quebec Seminary
 Blessed Marie-Catherine de Saint-Augustin, née Catherine de Longpré (1632-1664)
 Saint Marguerite d'Youville (1701-1771), née Marie-Marguerite Dufrost de Lajemmerais
 Cardinal Marc Ouellet (b. 1944)
 Venerable Alfred Pampalon (1867-1896), C.Ss.R.
 Cardinal Elzéar-Alexandre Taschereau (1820-1898), first Canadian cardinal

See also
List of people from Quebec
List of people from Montreal
List of people from Laval, Quebec
List of people from Ontario
List of people from Ottawa
List of people from Toronto
List of people from Calgary
List of people from Edmonton
List of people from British Columbia
List of people from Vancouver

References 

 
Quebec City
Quebec City